Peter C. Meinig (1939 – September 25, 2017) was a business executive and a Trustee at Cornell University.

Meinig received a BME degree in 1962 from Cornell University and an MBA in 1964 from Harvard University. At Cornell, he joined the International Fraternity of Phi Gamma Delta (Fiji).  In May 2007, Meinig donated $25 million to fund research grants to Cornell faculty in the life sciences and in 2015 he and his wife donated another $50 million to create the Meinig School of Biomedical Engineering. Meinig was also a member of the Sphinx Head Society.

References

External links
 Cornell Daily Sun obituary

Cornell University College of Engineering alumni
Harvard Business School alumni
Living people
Year of birth uncertain
Year of birth missing (living people)